The X-wing fighter is a starfighter from the fictional Star Wars universe. 

X-wing may also refer to:

Star Wars
 Star Wars: X-Wing (video game series), a series of space-based flight simulators set in the Star Wars universe.
 Star Wars: X-Wing (video game), the first game in the series
 Star Wars: X-Wing vs. TIE Fighter
 Star Wars: X-Wing Alliance
 Star Wars: X-wing (book series), a novel series by Michael A. Stackpole and Aaron Allston
 Star Wars: X-Wing Miniatures Game, a board game published by Fantasy Flight Games in August 2012
Star Wars: X-wing – Rogue Squadron, a 1995 comic book
 Star Wars: X-wing – Rogue Leader, a 2005 prequel to the 1995 comic book

Aviation
 10th Wing (disambiguation)
 X-Wing, an experimental Sikorsky S-72 aircraft
 A wing configuration, shaped like an X
 Xwing (aviation), an autonomous aviation company

Other uses
 X-wing, a style of aerodynamics devices on Formula One racing cars
 X-wing, a pattern in Sudoku puzzles
 Skystorm X-Wing Chopper, a fictional vehicle in the G.I. Joe universe, piloted by the Windmill figure

See also
 X (disambiguation)
 Ten (disambiguation)
 Wing (disambiguation)